, better known by his pen name  is a Japanese artist. He works for SNK. He has been involved in several iterations of The King of Fighters franchise.

Career
After graduating from Kyoto Seika University, Falcoon started as a fan-artist doing renditions games of different companies, such as The King of Fighters, Street Fighter, and JoJo's Bizarre Adventure. Falcoon joined SNK in 1998 as a card designer for SNK vs. Capcom: Card Fighters Clash. He was chosen to create the ingame artwork for SVC Chaos: SNK vs. Capcom. Falcoon mostly contributed on character designs and was responsible for the character artwork for The King of Fighters 2003. He was responsible for the alternate designs and new characters seen in the KOF: Maximum Impact series and was the KOF:MI series' producer and art director. Falcoon left SNK Playmore sometime in 2008 or 2009 for undisclosed reasons. All projects related to the Maximum Impact series were officially cancelled in October 2009.

He's now working for SNK in one of their subsidiary, SNK Entertainment.

Style
His art is recognized by its heavy emphasis on muscle and weight for both genders, shaded with sharp gradients and highlights. His designs are influenced by the clothing found in Japanese street fashion, particularly Lolita and Fruits fashions. In interviews, he insisted that he uses no reference for his work, relying only on "strong images from memory".

Works

References

External links
 Falcoon's blog at the official website of SNK
 
 Interview with IGN
 Interview with Gamasutra

Anime character designers
Living people
Year of birth missing (living people)
SNK
Video game artists